Daniel Berthiaume is a Canadian musician. He was born in Montreal, Quebec. A guitarist, he also plays keyboards and sings in a multitude of musical styles (rock, pop, jazz, blues, folk, Ambient Music, New Age, electronica, etc.).

Career
In the 1980s, Berthiaume travelled throughout Quebec with various groups, playing more than 400 concerts featuring covers of Supertramp, Genesis, U2, etc. and original compositions. It was during this period that he produced a first record entitled Yellow Street (Dance music) that was carried out in collaboration with DJ M.C. Mario. He also worked at that time with Allen McCartey (Men Without Hats), Steve Tracey (Loni Gamble, Céline Dion), Luc Phaneuf (Starmania), Yvan Payeur (Cirque du Soleil) and several other performers from Montreal.

He also wrote several music and sound tracks for corporate and advertising films. In the beginning of the 1990s, he was attracted by Ambient Music and quickly became prominent in this style. During this period, he produced seven albums—all nominated for the ADISQ award. He is now the lead singer and the lead guitarist with The Bluegators, featuring French drummer René Guérin and Kérassios Varipatis on doublebass.

Discography

Collaborations as a songwriter
 Agir, Réagir (2004) — Featuring: Youssou N’Dour, Jean-Jacques Goldman, Sapho 
 Je suis là (2005) — Featuring:  Princess Erika and Marina Vial
 If (2009) — Featuring: Daniel Powter, Justin Nozuka, Lara Fabian, Natasha St-Pier

Awards
In 1992, Berthiaume was awarded a Félix for The Sacred Fire as the album of the year, in the ambient/new-age category.

External links
 http://www.danielberthiaume.com/
 :fr:Liste des lauréats des prix Félix en 1992#Album nouvel-.C3.A2ge
http://www.answers.com/topic/les-grands-classiques-for-relaxation
https://web.archive.org/web/20131102200845/http://www.adisq.com/even-gala/archives/gala1990.html
https://web.archive.org/web/20131102201017/http://www.adisq.com/even-gala/archives/gala1991.html
https://web.archive.org/web/20131103130044/http://www.adisq.com/even-gala/archives/gala1992.html
https://web.archive.org/web/20131103173009/http://www.adisq.com/even-gala/archives/gala1995.html
https://web.archive.org/web/20100416132940/http://www.justepoureux.com/com/actions_agir.php
http://www.tv5.org/TV5Site/webtv/video-6862-If_Aides.htm
https://web.archive.org/web/20110721001724/http://www.lacomediatheatre.fr/pages/detailsartiste.php?idspectacles=63
https://web.archive.org/web/20110723030031/http://www.bluegators.net/daniel_berthiaume_guitariste_chanteur_de_montreal.ws
https://web.archive.org/web/20100817011953/http://www.ambient-music.biz/
http://biographiesartistesquebecois.com/Artiste-B/BerthiaumeDaniel/berthiaumedaniel.html
https://web.archive.org/web/20100820221224/http://www.virginmega.fr/artiste/daniel-berthiaume-500957,-1,page1.htm
http://www.renaud-bray.com/Disques_Produit.aspx?id=988087&def=Ang%C3%A9lique%2CBERTHIAUME%2C+DANIEL%2C978298103771
http://www.answers.com/topic/les-grands-classiques-for-relaxation
http://telecharger.musique.sfr.fr/album/Daniel_Berthiaume-O_Holy_Night/AL13595530.action
https://itunes.apple.com/us/artist/daniel-berthiaume/id336427202
https://web.archive.org/web/20110721015008/http://musique.orange.fr/daniel-berthiaume
http://www.getacd.es/artista_daniel_berthiaume-88107.html
http://www.atelierdesartistes.fr/index.php?page=detail&get_id=78&category=9
https://web.archive.org/web/20100416132940/http://www.justepoureux.com/com/actions_agir.php#auteur
https://web.archive.org/web/20110711132819/http://www.guidedzenmeditation.com/zen-meditation/daniel-berthiaume-zen-meditation-in-provence
http://www.kebec.fr/fr/Daniel-Kebec-Guitare.php
http://daniel-levi.pagesperso-orange.fr/pages/guest.html
https://web.archive.org/web/20101127070611/http://www.daniel-levi.com/participations
http://www.dep.ca/fr/produit_details.asp?ID=3652
https://web.archive.org/web/20110708032042/http://creationsrichardtrudeau.blogspot.com/2010/12/daniel-berthiaume-le-coeur-conscient.html
http://www.cegep-st-laurent.qc.ca/musique/le-departement/professeurs/jazz-populaire/percussions/mario-roy/

1956 births
New-age musicians
Canadian pop pianists
Canadian pop singers
Singers from Montreal
Living people
21st-century Canadian pianists